James Fitzpatrick or James FitzPatrick may refer to:  

James FitzPatrick (American football) (born 1964), American football player
James Fitzpatrick (hurler) (born 1985), Irish hurler
James Fitzpatrick (paediatrician) (born 1975), Australian paediatrician
James Fitzpatrick (rugby union) (1892–1973), American rugby union player
James A. FitzPatrick (1894–1980), American film producer, director, writer and narrator
James A. FitzPatrick (New York politician) (1916–1988), American lawyer and politician 
James J. Fitzpatrick, namesake of Fitzpatrick Stadium
James M. Fitzpatrick (1869–1949), U.S. Representative from New York
James E. Fitzpatrick, mayor of Burlington, Vermont
James Percy FitzPatrick (1862–1931), South African politician and author
James Fitzpatrick (outlaw) (died 1778), also known as Sandy Flash, American highwayman

See also 
 Jim Fitzpatrick (disambiguation)
 James A. FitzPatrick Nuclear Power Plant, near Oswego, New York
 Fitzpatrick (surname)
 Fitzpatrick (disambiguation)